Ana Sátila Vieira Vargas (born 13 March 1996) is a Brazilian slalom canoeist who has competed at the international level since 2011.

Career
She began sport training at the age of 4 and qualified for the Olympics at the age of 15.

Satila participated in 3 Olympic Games. At the 2012 Summer Olympics in London, Sátila was the youngest female competitor in canoe slalom. She competed in the K1 event, finishing 16th in the heats, failing to qualify for the semifinals. She finished in 17th place in the K1 event at the 2016 Summer Olympics in Rio de Janeiro.

She qualified to represent Brazil at the 2020 Summer Olympics in Tokyo in both women's events. She finished 13th in the K1 event after being eliminated in the semifinal and 10th in the final of the C1 event.

In 2015, Sátila won two medals at the Pan American Games held in Toronto, Ontario, Canada. She won gold in the C1 event and silver in the K1 event. At the ICF Canoe Slalom World Championships in London she finished 9th in the C1 event and 13th in the K1 event, after being eliminated in the semifinal.

She won three medals at the ICF Canoe Slalom World Championships with a gold (Extreme K1: 2018), a silver (Extreme K1: 2017) and a bronze (C1: 2017).

Number 3 in the world ranking, Ana Sátila became the first Brazilian woman to reach an Olympic final in canoe slalom. At the 2020 Tokyo Games, she finished in tenth and last place in the final of the C1 event, after getting a time of 164.71 on her run. She first incurred a 2 second penalty at gate 7, and then missed gate 22, which meant another 50 seconds of penalties.

World Cup individual podiums

1 World Championship counting for World Cup points

References

External links

Brazilian female canoeists
1996 births
Living people
Olympic canoeists of Brazil
Canoeists at the 2012 Summer Olympics
Canoeists at the 2016 Summer Olympics
Sportspeople from Minas Gerais
Canoeists at the 2015 Pan American Games
Canoeists at the 2019 Pan American Games
Pan American Games gold medalists for Brazil
Pan American Games silver medalists for Brazil
Pan American Games medalists in canoeing
Medalists at the ICF Canoe Slalom World Championships
Medalists at the 2015 Pan American Games
Medalists at the 2019 Pan American Games
Canoeists at the 2020 Summer Olympics
21st-century Brazilian women